The 2017–18 FK Austria Wien season was the 106th season in the club's history.

Transfers

In

Out

Bundesliga

League table

Results summary

Bundesliga fixtures and results

Austrian Cup

Austrian Cup Fixtures and results

Europa League

Qualifying rounds

Group stage

Friendly matches

Friendly fixtures and results

Player information

Squad and statistics

|}

References

FK Austria Wien seasons
Austria Wien